In mathematics, the Ramanujan–Soldner constant (also called the Soldner constant) is a mathematical constant defined as the unique positive zero of the logarithmic integral function. It is named after Srinivasa Ramanujan and Johann Georg von Soldner.

Its value is approximately μ ≈ 1.45136923488338105028396848589202744949303228… 

Since the logarithmic integral is defined by

then using  we have

thus easing calculation for numbers greater than μ.  Also, since the exponential integral function satisfies the equation

the only positive zero of the exponential integral occurs at the natural logarithm of the Ramanujan–Soldner constant, whose value is approximately ln(μ) ≈ 0.372507410781366634461991866…

External links

Mathematical constants
Srinivasa Ramanujan